The Humphreys-Ryan House is a historic house at 137 Garland Avenue in Hot Springs, Arkansas.  It is a -story wood-frame structure, with a cross-gable roof, clapboard siding, and a brick foundation.  A single-story porch extends across the front, supported by Tuscan columns with a simple stick balustrade.  Built in 1910 by Charles Humphreys, a local drugstore manager, it is a well-preserved local example of Colonial Revival architecture.

The house was listed on the National Register of Historic Places in 2000.

See also
National Register of Historic Places listings in Garland County, Arkansas

References

Houses on the National Register of Historic Places in Arkansas
Colonial Revival architecture in Arkansas
Houses completed in 1910
Houses in Hot Springs, Arkansas
National Register of Historic Places in Hot Springs, Arkansas
1910 establishments in Arkansas